Dashtollah (also Romanized as Dashtollāh) is a village in Nasrovan Rural District, in the Central District of Darab County, Fars Province, Iran. At the 2006 census, its population was 58, in 10 families.

References 

Populated places in Darab County